Mali i Zi (i.e. black mountain in Albanian) may refer to:

 Mali i Zi (tribe), a Albanian tribe
 , a region in Albania
 The Albanian name for Montenegro, a country in Europe
 The Albanian name for Crna Gora (mountain), a mountain in the Balkans
 The Albanian name for Crna Gora (region), a region in the Balkans

See also 
 Montenegro (disambiguation)
 Crna Gora (disambiguation)
 Black Mountain (disambiguation)

Albanian place names